The 1953 Cal Poly Mustangs football team represented California Polytechnic State College—now known as California Polytechnic State University, San Luis Obispo—as a member of the California Collegiate Athletic Association (CCAA) during the 1953 college football season. Led by fourth-year head coach LeRoy Hughes, Cal Poly compiled an overall record of 9–0 with a mark of 5–0 in conference play, winning the CCAA title for the second consecutive season. The team was dominant in every game, scoring 395 points while allowing only 65. The Mustangs played home games at Mustang Stadium in San Luis Obispo, California.

Schedule

Team players in the NFL
The following were selected in the 1954 NFL Draft.

References

Cal Poly
Cal Poly Mustangs football seasons
California Collegiate Athletic Association football champion seasons
College football undefeated seasons
Cal Poly Mustangs football